The Sinaloa Cartel-Gulf Cartel conflict was an armed conflict between the two Mexican cartels that began in 2004 and ended in 2010.

Start of the conflict
The fighting between the Sinaloa Cartel and the Gulf Cartel began after Osiel Cárdenas Guillén took command of the Gulf Cartel and started attacking the Sinaloa Cartel in order to conquer some of the Yucatán territories and expand; moreover, Cárdenas wanted to defeat the Sinaloa cartel and make the Gulf Cartel Mexico's most powerful drug trafficking organisation. The Sinaloa Cartel, with the help of their militia Los Negros, began to challenge the Gulf Cartel's domination of an important drug smuggling route into the United States through the Mexican city of Nuevo Laredo.

The conflict
With an agreement between the Sinaloa cartel and the Mexican authorities, the Mexican Army managed to arrest Osiel Cárdenas Guillén, after the latter ordered El Chapo's brother killed in 2004. The killing set off a chain of reprisals and led to an escalation of the violence between the two groups in 2005. After the arrest, the Sinaloa cartel managed to conquer the market for drugs, both hard and soft, but the fighting between the two groups intensified and became more bloody. In 2010, in order to stand up to the military might of the Sinaloa cartel, the Gulf cartel allied itself with the Juárez Cartel, the Tijuana Cartel and the Beltrán-Leyva Cartel, and also frequently used its militia, Los Zetas.
After the split of Los Zetas from Gulf Cartel, Gulf Cartel and Sinaloa Cartel do an agreement to stop the conflict and fighting Los Zetas.

2019-present minor clashes

The Gulf Cartel started to attack Sinaloa Cartel after the alliance with the Jalisco New Generation Cartel in 2019.

References

Organized crime conflicts in Mexico
Sinaloa Cartel
Gulf Cartel
Los Zetas
Battles of the Mexican drug war